Seconda B is a 1934 Italian comedy film directed by Goffredo Alessandrini and starring Sergio Tofano, Dina Perbellini and María Denis. It was screened at the Venice Film Festival where it was awarded a prize. It started a trend for "schoolgirl comedies" during the Fascist era, targeted primarily at girls and young women audiences. The title itself refers to a school class. The film is set in the early 1910s.

Synopsis
A school teacher falls in love with one of his female colleagues, who teaches gymnastics. She returns his love, but this is discovered by his students who try to sabotage their relationship.

Main cast
 Sergio Tofano as Professore Monti 
 Dina Perbellini as Professorina Vanni  
 María Denis as Marta Renzi 
 Ugo Ceseri as L'onorevole Renzi  
 Cesare Zoppetti as Il preside 
 Umberto Sacripante as Il bidello  
 Mercedes Brignone as Un'invitata alla festa dei Renzi 
 Gino Viotti as Un insegnante  
 Alfredo Martinelli as Un altro insegnante  
 Vinicio Sofia as Il segretario di Renzi  
 Liselotte Smith as Una compagna di scuola di Marta  
 Dora Baldanello as Petronilla  
 Amina Pirani Maggi as Signora Renzi  
 Zoe Incrocci as L'allieva Fumasoni  
 Elena Tryan-Parisini as L'insegnante di francese 
 Lina Bacci as L'insegnante Zucchi  
 Celeste Aída as Signora Cesira 
 Albino Principe as Un invitato al festo

References

Bibliography 
 De Grazia, Victoria. How Fascism Ruled Women: Italy, 1922-1945. University of California Press, 1992.
Moliterno, Gino. The A to Z of Italian Cinema. Scarecrow Press, 2009.
 Reich, Jacqueline & Garofalo, Piero. Re-viewing Fascism: Italian Cinema, 1922-1943. Indiana University Press, 2002.

External links 

 

1934 films
1930s historical comedy films
Italian historical comedy films
1930s Italian-language films
Films directed by Goffredo Alessandrini
Films set in the 1910s
Italian black-and-white films
1930s Italian films